Voice Mail is the second solo album by the English rock musician John Wetton. Initially released on 17 June 1994 in Japan only, it was re-released internationally as Battle Lines with the same musical content but different artwork.

Track listing

Personnel
John Wetton – all vocals, bass, acoustic guitar and keyboards
Bob Marlette – keyboards, grand piano, synthesizer and programming
Michael Landau – guitars
Michael Cartellone – drums
Claude Gaudette – keyboards and programming
Robert Fripp – guitar
Simon Phillips – drums
Steve Lukather – guitar
Dave Boruff – alto saxophone
Robbie Buchanan – grand piano
Jed Leiber – keyboards and programming
Paul Buckmaster – arrangements for orchestra

Technical personnel
Ron Nevison – production and engineering
Chris Lord-Alge – mixing at Image Recording Studios (Los Angeles, California)
Doug Sax – mastering at The Mastering Lab (Los Angeles, California)
Cat Gwynn – photography

References
Notes

Citations

John Wetton albums
1994 albums
Albums arranged by Paul Buckmaster
Albums produced by Ron Nevison
Progressive rock albums by English artists
Pop rock albums by English artists